Tennessee elected its members August 7–8, 1817.

See also 
 1816 and 1817 United States House of Representatives elections
 List of United States representatives from Tennessee

Notes 

1817
Tennessee
United States House of Representatives